Søren Berg (born May 15, 1976) is a retired Danish professional footballer.
He has been capped twice for the Denmark national football team.

Club career
Berg was born in Odense, Denmark and started his career at Danish amateur clubs, before he moved to top-flight club Odense BK in the Danish Superliga in 2000. Playing as either a right winger or striker, he was part of the Odense team that won the 2002 Danish Cup, and he made his debut for the Danish national team in April 2003. After a successful 2005–06 season, where he was called up for his second Danish national team game in March 2006, he attracted the interest of Norwegian team Viking FK. He was spotted in Stavanger by a journalist, where he received a contract offer from the Norwegian club. On June 6, 2006, it was reported that Berg had accepted the contract offer. and the club confirmed the signing three days later.

Randers FC
However, in the 2007–08 season, in January, Berg decided to move back to Denmark because he liked the Danish play style better than the style in Norway. He signed a three-year binding contract with the Danish SAS liga club Randers FC.

Berg made his first appearance for Randers in the Danish Cup quarter finals where he was in the starting line forming an attack duo with the also newly arrived teammate Marc Nygaard but was forced off the pitch soon after the start whistle due to an injury in his back. However the injury was not serious and Berg was back on the field the next week.

Berg scored his first goal for Randers FC on April 19, 2009. Despite criticism from the media, stating that Berg had not fulfilled the high expectations that was given to him after his transfer to Randers FC, he succeeded in scoring the winning goal against Brondby IF in a 2–1 victory. This result placed Randers FC at sixth place in the Danish Superliga.

AGF
On December 7, 2010, Berg signed a contract for two years with AGF.

FC Vestsjælland
In January 2013, Berg signed a -year contract with FC Vestsjælland.
In his first season with FCV, the club got promoted to the Danish Superliga.

Honours
Danish Cup: 2002

References

External links
 Danish national team profile 
 Career stats 

1976 births
Living people
Footballers from Odense
Danish men's footballers
Denmark international footballers
Odense Boldklub players
Viking FK players
Randers FC players
Aarhus Gymnastikforening players
FC Vestsjælland players
Danish Superliga players
Eliteserien players
Danish expatriate men's footballers
Expatriate footballers in Norway
Danish expatriate sportspeople in Norway
Association football forwards
Association football midfielders